Shiulibari is a 1962 Bengali film starring Uttam Kumar and Arundhati Devi. The film was released under the banner if Movietalk Private Limited It was a drama movie, directed by Pijush Bose and the screenplay was done by the legendary Tapan Sinha. Story was written by Subodh Ghosh and music was composed by Arundhati himself.

Plot
Little boy Biju (uttam kumar) was the youngest son of his father. One day Biju went to meet his elder sister and accidentally meets Niru, a little girl and became quite acquainted with her. One day, his father died out of heart attack. While distributing the properties of his father, Biju comes to know that his actual parents have died and that the person whom he thought to be his father is not his parent. Biju was very upset until he left the town and came to a place where there was no inhabitant. He decided to build a colony over there along with the "sautals" living there. The build up nail ?, good and also invited many business man from different parts of the world to buy land over there and make the area prosperous with employment and technology. One day while he went to the city to purchase some important things, he came to know that Niru's father has died and that now she is a widow, living a pathetic life until went to meet her and asked her to go with him in his colony which he has developed with his own toil and will. Thus, Niru came with him. The colony came to be karan ? as shiuli bari and the railway locality ? on colony and thus he followed the path of humanity which was shown to him by his father.

Cast
Uttam Kumar
Arundhati Devi
Chhabi Biswas
Tarun Kumar
Dilip Ray
Moni Srimani
Mihir Bhattacharya
Bireshwar Sen
Chandan Ray
Shefali Bandyopadhyay
Ranjana Bandyopadhyay
Rathin Ghosh

Soundtrack
The music of the film composed by Arundhati Devi and lyrics was written by Sailen Roy.

References

1962 films
Bengali-language Indian films
1960s Bengali-language films